Jared Andrew Kusnitz (born November 8, 1988) is an American actor. He has appeared in the films Doll Graveyard (2005), Dance of the Dead (2008), and Prom (2011), and television series such as The Secret Life of the American Teenager, Good Luck Charlie, and  Underemployed.

Early life
Kusnitz was born in Fort Lauderdale, Florida, where he was raised. He is Jewish.

Filmography

Film

Television

References

External links
 
 

1988 births
Male actors from Fort Lauderdale, Florida
Jewish American male actors
American male film actors
American male television actors
Living people
Male actors from Florida
Place of birth missing (living people)
21st-century American Jews